The  was a Japanese manufacturer of military aircraft during World War II. While it mainly manufactured other firms' designs, it was notable for the radical J7W "Shinden" fighter. Named after Kyushu island where the company was based.

The company originated from Fukuoka-based Watanabe Tekkōjo (Watanabe Steel Foundry), which started building aircraft in 1935. In 1943 the aircraft division was spun off as Kyūshū Hikōki, while the original company was renamed Kyūshū Heiki (Kyūshū Armaments).

After the war, the company was renamed Watanabe Jidōsha Kōgyō (Watanabe Automobile Industries) and manufactured automobile bodies and parts. It was dissolved in 2001.

Products
 E9W - 'Slim' 1935 submarine-based reconnaissance floatplane
 J7W 震電 Shinden (Magnificent Lightning) - 1945 pusher fighter prototype
 K6W - WS-103 seaplane for Royal Siamese Navy
 K8W - 1938 floatplane trainer prototype, lost to the Kawanishi K8K
 K9W カエデ Momiji (Maple) - 'Cypress' 1939 basic trainer; license-built Bücker Bu 131 Jüngmann
 K10W - 'Oak' 1943 intermediate trainer
 K11W 白菊 Shiragiku (White Chrysanthemum) - 1943 crew trainer
 Q1W 東海 Tokai (Eastern Sea) - 'Lorna' 1945 ASW/patrol aircraft
 Q3W 南海 Nankai (South Sea) - 1945 ASW/patrol aircraft prototype based on the K11W

References

Defunct aircraft manufacturers of Japan
Kyushu